Allen Hulsey (born February 8, 1985) is a singer, songwriter, guitarist and visual artist. He is the founding member of New York City–based music duo Muj. Allen has also pursued musical projects outside of Muj's work, including numerous collaborations with other bands such as Emperor City Motorcade. He is also inclined towards acting, having worked in a 2011 short movie, I'm So Tall. Allen's paintings have also been exhibited in a number of venues, including Flamboyan Theatre.

Early life
Born in Rochester, New York (February 8, 1985), Allen was attuned to music from early years of childhood, responding intensely to local church bells as an infant and writing his first songs shortly thereafter. Allen moved to Turkey at the age of 7, at which point he undertook the study of cello and piano. He began playing guitar before attending boarding school in Germany at age 13.  At boarding school Allen was introduced to a plethora of more modern music, which he incorporated into his vast knowledge of classical musics. He also then started to play bowed guitar in order to incorporate his prior knowledge of cello with his guitar playing. His rendition of Saint-Saëns' Le Cygne, later appeared in I'm So Tall, an art film starring Allen and directed by Yael Zeevi, in 2011. Exploring microtonal music and Turkish art/folk music lead him to apply to Berklee College of Music in 2003. Allen studied modern classical music privately, alongside the jazz composition courses he took at Berklee, studying under David Tronzo, Ken Pulig, Yokob Gubanov, and David Fiuczynski.

Upon graduating in 2006, Allen moved to New York City, NY. In New York, Allen played with multiple bands, taught and did session work. Allen composed music for modern and traditional dance, performing at the LaMama Moves! Dance festival "World Summit" 2007. For two years Allen played lead guitar for Emperor City Motorcade, with whom he performed on WRXP 101.9 hosted by Matt Pinfield. While with this band he also performed at Bowery Ballroom, Gramercy Theater, Webster Hall, and Mercury Lounge. In 2009, Allen formed Muj with Emre Atabay, his Berklee friend. The duo recorded "Muj 2012", releasing the album in 2010.

Styles and influences
Allen's styles of guitar playing includes extended guitar techniques such as fretless guitar, slide guitar, prepared guitar. He has been strongly influenced by Erkan Ogur, Fred Frith, David Tronzo, Derek Bailey and John Cage. Allen has also been an admirer of John Lennon and especially Dani Rabin of Marbin. He participates in and is a founding member of yearly tribute to the life and music of John Lennon. The event is held in Central Park on December 8, the anniversary of Lennon's assassination. Performing in the Naumburg Band Shell across from Strawberry Field, hundreds gather each year in the freezing cold to celebrate and remember the music of John Lennon.

Allen also has a side project called Monality.

Instruments and recordings
Allen primarily plays Fender Stratocaster, Silvertone 1457, twelve-string acoustic and Harmony hollowbody guitars. He uses alternative tuning in most of his songs, including Open G, Open D and C# Minor tuning. He has solo recordings and has recorded with Geron Hoy, Emperor City Motorcade, Jenn Logue, Ignacio, 6L6, and Muj. Allen performed guitar tracks fororiginal music for the movie Rex.

See also

References

External links 

 
 

1985 births
Living people
American rock guitarists
American male guitarists
American rock singers
Berklee College of Music alumni
Musicians from Rochester, New York
Guitarists from New York (state)
21st-century American singers
21st-century American guitarists
21st-century American male singers